Halstad can refer to a location in the United States:

 The city of Halstad, Minnesota
 Halstad Township, Norman County, Minnesota

See also
Halsted (disambiguation)